The wildlife of Lesotho is composed of its flora and fauna.
Lesotho has 60 species of mammals and 339 species of birds.

Fauna

Mammals

African leopard
South African cheetah

Birds

Reptiles

Flora
Grass is the natural vegetation in Lesotho. The high plateau is covered with montane or subalpine grassland. Red oat grass forms a dry carpet in much of the Drakensberg foothill region.

References

Sources
Kovtunovich, V. & Ustjuzhanin, P. 2011. On the fauna of the plume moths (Lepidoptera: Pterophoridae) of Lesotho. African Invertebrates 52 (1): 167-175.

External links

Biota of Lesotho
Lesotho